Better Days, released on December 9, 2003, is the second EP by the New Jersey heavy metal quintet God Forbid.

Track listing

Personnel
 Byron Davis – lead vocals
 Doc Coyle – lead guitar, clean vocals
 Dallas Coyle – rhythm guitar
 John "Beeker" Outcalt – bass guitar
 Corey Pierce – drums

References

God Forbid albums
2003 EPs
Century Media Records EPs